Mahzad is a Persian female given name from Old Persian Mah "moon" and the common Persian name suffix zad "child", "descendant".

References

Persian feminine given names